Carne seca may refer to:

Carne-seca, a kind of dried, salted meat, usually beef, used in Brazilian cuisine
Carne seca, a kind of dried beef in Mexican cuisine
Lou Carnesecca (born 1925), American college basketball coach
Carnesecca Arena, an arena named after Lou Carnesecca